is a Japanese professional shogi player ranked 7-dan. He is known for developing the set of Cheerful Central Rook openings.

Early life
Kondō was born on May 31, 1971, in Kashiwazaki, Niigata. He entered the Japan Shogi Association's apprentice school in 1983 at the rank of 6-kyū under the guidance of shogi professional  . He was promoted to the rank of 1-dan in 1987, and obtained full professional status and the rank of 4-dan in October 1996.

Promotion history
Kondō's promotion history is as follows:

 6-kyū: 1983
 1-dan: 1987
 4-dan: October 1, 1996
 5-dan: September 12, 2001
 6-dan: July 19, 2007
 7-dan: May 20, 2021

Awards and honors
Kondō received the Japan Shogi Association the Masuda Award for 2001 as well as the Annual Shogi Awards for "Best Winning Percentage" and "Most Consecutive Games Won" for 2004.

References

External links
ShogiHub: Professional Player Info · Kondo, Masakazu
 Lectures on the Latest Strategies: Lecture 5: Gokigen Central Rook · discussion of Kondō's development of Cheerful Central Rook strategies.

Japanese shogi players
Living people
Professional shogi players
Professional shogi players from Niigata Prefecture
Recipients of the Kōzō Masuda Award
1971 births